Tilting Point is a free-to-play (F2P) games publisher founded in 2012. In the years since, Tilting Point has grown to include over 200 staff members and office locations in New York, Boston, Barcelona, Kyiv, Seoul, and San Diego. Further partnerships with development studios and publishers exist in over a dozen countries.

The company publishes and manages live F2P games, and in some cases co-develops games with partner studios as well as runs live services for owned games through internal studios. Examples of such titles are: SpongeBob: Krusty Cook-Off, Star Trek Timelines, Warhammer: Chaos & Conquest, Languinis, Narcos: Cartel Wars, TerraGenesis, and Zombieland: AFK Survival.

Company

Business Model 
Tilting Point created a new form of publishing called "Progressive Publishing", which has two main parts. The first is live publishing (which they call "Power Up"), which is a focus on publishing games that are already active. This includes user acquisition funding/management and other publishing services (asset creation, ASO [app store optimization], ad monetization, production management, and live operations). Secondarily is development (or "Team Up"). This includes funding the production of a game and other related services (game design, marketing/PR, IP licensing, and community management). Tilting Point has also been known to acquire independent developers or games.

History 
Tilting Point was founded in 2012 by Dan Sherman and Kevin Segalla as Tilting Point Media.

From 2012 to 2015, Tilting Point focused on pay-to-play games.

In 2015 the company hired Samir Agili as Chief Product Officer and Jean-Sebastien Laverge as VP of Growth to transition the company from a pay-to-play games publisher to a free-to-play game publisher.

Following Samir Agili's arrival, the company accelerated its user acquisition expertise and launched its first ever user acquisition fund in November 2016. The fund (initially $12 million), called Game Alliance, was intended for use by independent game developers to scale user acquisition campaigns. This launched a continued effort by the company to assist developers with user acquisition costs. In 2018, Tilting Point expanded its user acquisition fund to $132 million.

2016 also marked the launch of "D.O.R.A." or "Dynamically Optimized Revenue Optimization". DORA is an in-house developed artificial intelligence (AI) that makes predictions about customer lifetime value (LTV). The system uses key performance indicators (KPIs) data to make user acquisition campaign spend amount recommendations.

One of the two original founders, Dan Sherman, left the company in January 2018 and Samir Agili replaced him as president, Chief Operating Officer, and board member.

Tilting Point also developed "C.A.T." or "Creative Automation Technology" 100% in-house in 2018. This system automatically generates static and video advertisements using content supplied to it. This allows user acquisition and marketing managers to run more campaigns across a variety of platforms.

In September 2019, Tilting Point acquired Gondola, a service that leverages machine learning to assist mobile game developers with optimizing in-game economies and rewarded video ads. The company has since been folded into Tilting Point as a whole.

In March 2020, Tilting Point acquired Star Trek Timelines from Disruptor Beam. At the same time, they created Wicked Realm Games with 19 former Disruptor Beam staff members (including former CTO David Cham as the new studio head).

July 2020 marked the purchase of FTX Games and Plamee, including three of their games: Narcos: Cartel Wars, The Walking Dead: Casino Slots, and Criminal Minds: The Mobile Game.

In February 2022, Tilting Point announced it had acquired Korean game developer, AN Games.

Funding 
In 2018, Tilting Point made a deal with direct-lending firm Metropolitan Partners Group for a $132 million annual investment. This was used to expand Tilting Point's user acquisition fund.

Acquisitions

Owned Studios & Offices

Active studios

Games

Awards 

 2014 Apple Design Award - Leo's Fortune
 2014 App Store Best of (Runner-up) - Leo's Fortune
 2014 Global Game Awards - Best Mobile Game (3rd Place) for Leo's Fortune
 2015 App Store Best of - Beat Sports
 2019 Apple Best of - Blockbusters Reborn for Warhammer: Chaos & Conquest
 2020 PocketGamer.biz's Top 50 Mobile Game Makers (Number 27)
2020 Google Play Best Pick Up & Play Game Selection for SpongeBob: Krusty Cook-Off
2020 Google Play Users' Choice Game Award for SpongeBob: Krusty Cook-Off (USA)

Nominations 
 2015 International Mobile Gaming Awards Global - Excellence in Gameplay for Leo's Fortune
 2015 International Mobile Gaming Awards Global - Excellence in Audio Visual Art & Design for Leo's Fortune
 2017 International Mobile Gaming Awards Global - Star Trek Timelines
 2018 The Webby Awards - Best Word & Trivia Game for Bold Moves
 2019 Pocket Gamer - Best Publisher
 2020 Pocket Gamer - Best LiveOps for Warhammer: Chaos & Conquest
 2020 Pocket Gamer - Best Publisher
 2020 Pocket Gamer - Best Marketing Team

External links

References 

Companies based in New York City
Mobile game companies
Video game companies of the United States
Video game companies established in 2012
Video game development companies
Video game publishers